Staburags or Staburadze was an unusual 18-metre high cliff on the bank of Daugava in Latvia shaped and formed by lime-rich springs. According to a legend, it was a mourning girl that had turned into rock.

Since 1965 the cliff has been 6.5 meters underwater due to the construction of Pļaviņas Hydroelectric Power Station dam.

In literature 

In Andrejs Pumpurs' epic poem Lāčplēsis, Staburadze was the name of a goddess living in a Crystal Palace beneath the whirlpool of the cliff.

References

External links 

 

Landforms of Latvia
Waterfalls of Latvia
Submerged waterfalls